Ioan Auer (born 1902, date of death unknown) was a Romanian footballer who played as a striker.

International career
Ioan Auer played in the first official match of Romania's national team, a 2–1 victory against Yugoslavia at the 1922 King Alexander's Cup.

References

External links
 

1902 births
Year of death missing
Romanian footballers
Romania international footballers
Place of birth missing
Association football forwards
Vagonul Arad players